Buckland is a rural locality in the Central Highlands Region, Queensland, Australia. In the  Buckland had a population of 44 people.

History 
Buckland State School opened on 25 October 1909 and closed on 1959.

In the  Buckland had a population of 44 people.

References 

Central Highlands Region
Localities in Queensland